Dendrophorbium is a genus of South American flowering plants in the family Asteraceae.

Species accepted by the Plants of the World Online as of December 2022:

References

 
Asteraceae genera
Flora of South America
Taxonomy articles created by Polbot